Lingnan penjing (Jyutping: Ling5 naam5 pun4 ging2; Traditional Chinese: 嶺南盆景), sometimes called Cantonese penjing (Jyutping: Jyut6 paai3 pun4 ging2; Traditional Chinese: 粵派盆景) is the style of penjing (called "Pun-ging" in Cantonese) of the Lingnan region - the mainly Cantonese-speaking Southern Chinese provinces of Guangdong and Guangxi. Despite being recognized only in early 20th century, this style can trace its roots to at least the 15th century.

Aesthetics
It is said that Lingnan penjing "embraces nature", and is not inclined to be bounded by rules or formula. It has been described as "Spring from the Mother Nature, Exceed the Mother Nature”: This style is noted for an emphasis on the match between "the natural" and "the artificial" parts of the bonsai. For instance, artists of Lingnan penjing tend to spend much time choosing a pot that matches that plants. Furthermore, it explicitly focuses on "inner beauty" - Lingnan penjing artists always pay attention to the penjing's has its own unique ambiance and mood. When viewing a Lingnan penjing, a viewer is expected to savor the messages and emotions behind the penjing work.

Techniques
Lingnan penjing artists generally prune their trees with the “Grow and Clip” method. Instead of using wires to bend them, the branches keep being clipped as they grow. Every clip creates a new twist and a new session on the said branch, and in every session grows new branches. At last, as the tree keeps growing and being pruned in this way, it will taper from the base to apex. The result is that the proportions between the trunk and branches will be highly developed, with branches full of turns and twists.

See also
Penjing
Cantonese culture
Lingnan garden

References

External links
The Lingnan Penjing Academy of Australia: Landing Page

Cantonese folk art
Lingnan garden
Bonsai
Chinese gardening styles
Trees